Charmed is an American television series that was originally broadcast by The WB for eight seasons from October 7, 1998, until May 21, 2006. The series has earned various awards and nominations for its cast, crew and the series itself. Overall, Charmed has won 27 awards from 54 nominations.

Academy of Motion Picture Arts and Sciences

AOL TV

ASCAP Film and Television Music Awards

Beliefnet

Cable Guide Awards (UK)

Chicago Tribune

Cult TV (UK)

Cult TV Festival Awards

E! Online

EDGE Awards

Family Television Awards

Golden Tater Awards

Hollywood Makeup Artist and Hair Stylist Guild Awards

Hollywood Post Alliance Awards

HuffPost TV/AOL TV

International Horror Guild Awards

NAACP Image Awards

Nickelodeon Kids' Choice Awards

RATTY Awards

Saturn Awards

Seventeen magazine

Spacey Awards (Canada)

Teen Choice Awards

Tubey Awards

TV Guide

TV Guide Awards

Wand Awards

Wonderwall

Young Artist Awards

References

Charmed (TV series)
Lists of awards by television series